Antonio Di Carlo (born 6 June 1962) is a retired Italian professional footballer who played as a midfielder.

He played for three seasons in the Serie A for A.S. Roma from 1984 to 1987. He also played for Roma in the UEFA Cup Winners' Cup, scoring a goal against Real Zaragoza.

Honours
Roma
 Coppa Italia winner: 1985–86.

1962 births
Living people
Italian footballers
Serie A players
Serie B players
Serie C players
Piacenza Calcio 1919 players
S.S. Arezzo players
A.S. Roma players
Genoa C.F.C. players
Parma Calcio 1913 players
A.C. Ancona players
A.C. Perugia Calcio players
Avezzano Calcio players
Association football midfielders